Yuri Vasilyevich Malyshev (27 August 1941  8 November 1999) was a Soviet cosmonaut who served on the Soyuz T-2 (5–9 June 1980) and Soyuz T-11 (3–11 April 1984) missions.

Awards and honors
 Twice Hero of the Soviet Union (16 June 1980 and 11 April 1984)
 Pilot-Cosmonaut of the USSR (16 June 1980)
 Two Orders of Lenin (16 June 1980 and 11 April 1984)
 Ashoka Chakra (India, 1984)

Publications
 Co-author of the book USSR-India. At Space Orbit

References

1941 births
1999 deaths
Soviet Air Force officers
Soviet cosmonauts
Heroes of the Soviet Union
Recipients of the Order of Lenin
Recipients of the Ashoka Chakra (military decoration)
People from Nikolayevsk
Ashoka Chakra
Salyut program cosmonauts